Kentucky Route 764 (KY 764) is a  rural secondary state highway in southern Daviess County and northern Ohio County. It begins at a junction with U.S. Route 231 (US 231) south of Masonville. The road heads to Pleasant Ridge and intersects KY 2115. The road then heads easterly and then passes under Interstate 165 (I-165, William H. Natcher Parkway). KY 764 intersects KY 762, then it passes over the Greasy Creek. It finally intersects KY 1738 before passing back into Daviess County, where it enters the community of Oklahoma. The road goes to Whitesvile, running concurrently with KY 54. KY 764 separates from KY 54, and then intersects KY 2157, and after a few miles, it ends at KY 144 west of Pellville. The first few miles are signed as east–west, with the remaining signed as north–south.

Major intersections

References

External links

764
Transportation in Daviess County, Kentucky
Transportation in Ohio County, Kentucky